Jesse van Muylwijck (born 19 March 1961, Groningen) is a Dutch cartoonist. He is the winner of the 2010 Stripschapprijs.

References

1961 births
Living people
Dutch cartoonists
People from Groningen (city)
University of Groningen alumni
Winners of the Stripschapsprijs